Dhammayangyi Temple is a Buddhist temple located in Bagan, Myanmar. Largest of all the temples in Bagan, the Dhammayan as it is popularly known was built during the reign of King Narathu (1167-1170). Narathu, who came to the throne by assassinating his father Alaungsithu and his elder brother, presumably built this largest temple to atone for his sins.

The Dhammayangyi is the widest temple in Bagan, and is built in a plan similar to that of Ananda Temple. Burmese chronicles state that while the construction of the temple was in the process, the king was assassinated by some Indians and thus the temple was not completed. Sinhalese sources however indicate that the king was killed by Sinhalese invaders.

The temple's interior is bricked up for unknown reasons, thus only the four porches and the outer corridors are accessible.

References

External links

 Photos of Dhammayangyi Temple at Have Camera Will Travel
 Dhammayangyi Temple photos on Flickr
 MyanmarBagan Travel Information

Buddhist temples in Myanmar
12th-century Buddhist temples
Bagan